The cabinet of Egyptian Prime Minister Hazem Al Beblawi was sworn in on 16 July 2013. Al Beblawi was appointed on 9 July 2013 by interim president Adly Mansour. The cabinet is made up of 34 members – mostly liberal technocrats and no Islamists.

The first resignation from the cabinet was that of Mohammad ElBaradei, who had been appointed vice president in July 2013. ElBaradei resigned from office on 14 August stating "he could not bear the responsibility for decisions he disagreed with."

Resignation 
The government resigned unexpectedly on 24 February 2014. Some members of the cabinet have remained in office in a "caretaker" position. News sources attributed the resignation to a series of strikes in the country, a shortage of cooking gas and conflict between the security services and supporters of the Muslim Brotherhood. Beblawi gave a televised address to announce the resignation but gave no clear reason for it.  The AFP quoted Hani Saleh, a government spokesman, as saying that there was a "feeling that new blood was needed."

Cabinet members

References

 
2013 establishments in Egypt
2014 disestablishments in Egypt
Cabinets of Egypt
Cabinets established in 2013
Cabinets disestablished in 2014